The Henry Ogburn House, located about  off U.S. Route 42 in Carrollton, Kentucky, was built in 1845.  It was listed on the National Register of Historic Places in 1987.

It is a three-bay two-story central passage plan dry stone house, with Greek Revival style.

The listing included a second contributing building, a two-room log "quarters" building

References

National Register of Historic Places in Carroll County, Kentucky
Greek Revival architecture in Kentucky
Houses completed in 1845
1845 establishments in Kentucky
Houses on the National Register of Historic Places in Kentucky
Central-passage houses
Houses in Carroll County, Kentucky
Carrollton, Kentucky